Ritchie Davies (born 27 November 1971) is a Welsh former professional darts player from Aberdare. He is best known for his run at the 2003 BDO World Darts Championship, where he reached the final.

Career
Davies made his World Championship debut in 1997 but managed to win only one match (a 3–0 win over Les Wallace in 2000) in his first six visits to the Lakeside. He then produced his run to the final in 2003.

In doing so, he beat Albertino Essers, former champion John 'Boy' Walton, and defending champion Tony David for the loss of just one set, before defeating Gary Anderson 5–2 in the semi-finals. Davies then gave Raymond van Barneveld a scare, as he recovered from 4–0 down to trail by just 4–3 before van Barneveld found enough to beat him 6–3 and win his third title.

Davies made the quarter-finals the following year, with renewed confidence, but was beaten in the quarter-finals this time around by Mervyn King. It would be his last appearance in the World Championship.

In other BDO tournaments, he was the winner of the Swedish Open in 1997, British Classic in 2000 and the Scottish Open in 2002. He also reached some Open finals including the Scottish Open in 1997, the 1997 British Open, 1998 England Open and 2003 Welsh Open.

Davies retired from competitive darts in 2005 due to work commitments.

World Championship performances

BDO

 1997: 1st round (lost to Leo Laurens 0–3)
 1998: 1st round (lost to Colin Monk 1–3)
 1999: 1st round (lost to Chris Mason 1–3)
 2000: 2nd round (lost to Colin Monk 0–3)
 2001: 1st round (lost to John Walton 1–3)
 2002: 1st round (lost to Tony David 1–3)
 2003: Runner-up (lost to Raymond van Barneveld 3–6)
 2004: Quarter-final (lost to Mervyn King 4–5)

External links
Profile and stats on Darts Database

1971 births
Living people
Welsh darts players
British Darts Organisation players